Jannat is a 2008 Indian Hindi-language romantic crime film directed by Kunal Deshmukh, and produced by Mukesh Bhatt. The film stars Emraan Hashmi opposite Sonal Chauhan in lead roles. It released on 16 May 2008 and was a  success worldwide, receiving positive response from critics.

Plot
Arjun (Emraan Hashmi) is a street-smart youngster with an obsession for making a quick buck. He has a chance meeting with a girl called Zoya (Sonal Chauhan) who's looking at an expensive ring inside a glass case. Arjun breaks the glass and retrieves the ring for which he is arrested. Inspector Shekhar (Sameer Kochhar) is amused but lets him go with a warning as he knows Arjun's father. Zoya gives him the reasons he was looking for to move out of his ordinary life and become rich for this girl. He steps up from playing small-time card games to becoming a bookie and strikes gold.

After impressing Zoya with his wealth, he calls his father for lunch in his new house. His father, a simple man who has lived an honest life, is happy to see Arjun's success but is skeptical of his business methods. He has a private talk with Zoya and tells her Arjun was a habitual and a smooth liar. Later that day when Zoya questions Arjun, he is offended and blames his father's failure in life for his resentment towards him.

Arjun is whisked off to South Africa where he meets Don Abu Ibrahim (Javed Sheikh) and becomes his key match-fixer. Rolling in money and enjoying a fast life with Zoya everything is suddenly interrupted when the South African Police take notice. Inspector Shekhar, now an ACP with the CBI is summoned for assisting the investigation and is puzzled to see Arjun with the Don. He contacts Zoya to help trap Arjun after letting her know of the investigation. She speaks to Arjun's father who trusts ACP Shekhar and requests Zoya to help him and leave Arjun if she can't get him to change his dishonest ways. Zoya calls Arjun going to a restaurant discussion for zoya in Interval scene. The ambush before from the cops made him confess his crimes. but police cops trace our eyes for Arjun habit and behaviour and then police cops after doing arresting for Arjun and ACP Shekhar and team and police cops has carry and Handcruft for Arjun But Arjun going to jail and Lockup  

Arjun is sentenced to 5 years imprisonment but Don Abu Ibrahim uses his influence to get him out of prison to use Arjun's skills for the upcoming World Cup. Arjun is released in 6 months and meets ACP Shekhar outside who warns him to mend his ways again. Arjun relents and starts working as a bartender. All is good for a while, and Zoya is pregnant until Don Abu Ibrahim visits him one day. Arjun is torn and confused but eventually decides to participate in this last operation so that he has enough money for the future. Zoya overhears him speaking to a bookie and is disgusted. She leaves the house after notifying the cops. Arjun is then chased by ACP Shekhar and the cops and is shot in the shoulder. He calls Zoya and pleads to meet with her one last time before surrendering. Cornered with Zoya, Arjun surrenders with the cops pointing their gun at him. Arjun notices the ring that fell from his pocket and bends to retrieve it. The cops, assuming he is going for his gun, shoot and kill Arjun.

A few years later, Zoya and her son are seen shopping in a supermarket. Zoya is unable to pay the full amount as she is short on cash. Her son notices it and discards his toy so she can pay the bill. She realizes that he is not greedy like his father. She hugs her son and smiles as the film ends.

Cast
 Emraan Hashmi as Arjun Dixit
 Sonal Chauhan as Zoya Mathur (Few lines as Mona Ghosh Shetty)
 Javed Sheikh as Abu Ibrahim (Underworld Don)
 Sameer Kochhar as ACP Shekhar Malhotra
 Vishal Malhotra as Vishal Grover
 Vipin Sharma as Mukesh Dixit, Arjun's father
 Shakeel Khan as Shadaab
 Abhimanyu Singh as Shakeel Ahmed (Abu Ibrahim's sidekick)
 Vineet Kumar Singh as Cricket Team's Captain

Soundtrack

The soundtrack of the film is composed by Pritam with lyrics penned by Sayeed Quadri, Kamran Ahmed, R. Mehndi and Neelesh Misra. The album consists of 6 original songs, one remix and one Power Ballad. Kamran Ahmed wrote, sung and composed the smash hit Judaai. The music received generally positive reviews and the songs Judaai, Zara Sa, Haan Tu Hai and Jannat Jahan became chartbusters. K.K. was nominated for the Filmfare Award for Best Male Playback Singer for his song Zara Sa while Kamran Ahmed won the MTV Breakthrough Artist Award for his song Judaai.
Songs are as follows

Reception 

Atta Khan of Planet Bollywood wrote about the soundtrack "In short Jannat has the hallmarks of Pritam at his very best; it is a vibrant, classy, and extremely enjoyable soundtrack that reaches out to the masses and therefore sells itself, just go and soak up its glorious rock-infused sounds and then reflect on why we all love Pritam…talent is a word too easily used in this day and age but he clearly has it in abundance (controversy aside!) and gave an 8/10 rating."

Satyajit from Glamsham noted "The teamwork of Pritam, Sayed Quadri, Neelesh Mishra props up with another remarkable album for Bhatt camp in the form of JANNAT. The album ensures itself to be this year's one of best sellers with tracks like Zara Sa, Judai and Jannat Jahan promising golden results". According to the Indian trade website Box Office India, with around 16,00,000 units sold, this film's soundtrack album was the year's seventh highest-selling.

Reception 
The film was met with critical acclaim along with its soundtrack being well praised. The film collected in 5 weeks, a considerable amount for its small budget and release. Noyon Jyoti Parasara of AOL India rated it 3.5 out of 5 and said, "When we have something in a movie that appeals to everyone, that's when we call it a masala entertainer – probably. Keeping this in mind, Jannat, with a decent measure of romance, thrill, comedy, tragedy and of course cricket is definitely a masala flick." The film was eventually declared as a super hit, earning  worldwide.

Sequel
The sequel to Jannat was released on 4 May 2012, under the title of Jannat 2. The main direction/production crew remained the same. It was directed by Kunal Deshmukh, and produced by Mukesh Bhatt and Mahesh Bhatt once again. Emraan Hashmi also appeared as the male lead actor again, opposite Esha Gupta, with Randeep Hooda in a supporting role. The music for the sequel was composed by Pritam. It was also commercially successful and grossed .

References

External links 
 Official website
 

2000s crime films
2000s Hindi-language films
2008 films
Films about corruption in India
Films about cricket in India
Films featuring songs by Pritam
Fox Star Studios films
Hindi-language films based on actual events
Indian crime films
Indian romance films
Romantic crime films
Sports films based on actual events